Matthew Lewis (born August 1, 1996) is an American soccer player who plays for Detroit City FC in the USL Championship.

Career

Youth and College
Lewis played four years of college soccer at Fordham University between 2014 and 2017. During his time with the Rams, Lewis tallied 5 goals and 5 assists across 84 appearances.

Professional
On January 22, 2018, Lewis signed a homegrown player contract with MLS side Sporting Kansas City. He made his professional debut on March 17, 2018 for Sporting Kansas City's United Soccer League affiliate Swope Park Rangers, appearing as a 30th-minute substitute during a 4–3 win over Reno 1868.

On June 27, 2018, Lewis moved permanently from Sporting Kansas City to their USL affiliate Swope Park Rangers.

Lewis was released by Swope Park on December 3, 2018.

After playing with the New York Cosmos B in 2019, Lewis returned to Kansas City by signing with the Major Arena Soccer League's Kansas City Comets. In 2020, Lewis signed with the New York Cosmos first team and was immediately loaned to Detroit City FC.

On July 23, 2021, Lewis signed on a short-term loan with USL Championship side El Paso Locomotive and returned to Detroit City on August 1, 2021.

References

External links

Fordham Rams bio
MASL bio
 

1996 births
Living people
American soccer players
Association football defenders
Fordham Rams men's soccer players
Soccer players from Kansas City, Missouri
Sporting Kansas City players
Missouri Comets players
New York Cosmos (2010) players
New York Cosmos B players
Detroit City FC players
El Paso Locomotive FC players
Sporting Kansas City II players
USL Championship players
National Premier Soccer League players
Major Arena Soccer League players
National Independent Soccer Association players
Homegrown Players (MLS)